Titaniidae is a family of crustaceans belonging to the order Isopoda.

Genera:
 Antidorcasia Kensley, 1971 	 
 Coatonia Kensley, 1971 	 
 Kogmania Barnard, 1932 	 
 Phylloniscus Purcell, 1903 	 
 Titana Budde-Lund, 1909

References

Isopoda